István Demeter (born 7 January 1972) is a Hungarian wrestler. He competed in the men's freestyle 62 kg at the 1996 Summer Olympics.

References

1972 births
Living people
Hungarian male sport wrestlers
Olympic wrestlers of Hungary
Wrestlers at the 1996 Summer Olympics
People from Reghin